The Thunderbolt  (real name: Yz) is a fictional character appearing in comics published by DC Comics and the name of other fictional genie variants within the 5th Dimension as well. Yz was originally portrayed as a genie-like character who hosts Johnny Thunder and then later Jakeem Thunder. He also appeared as an original and ordinary member of the Justice Society of America.

Jim Gaffigan and Seth Green each voiced the character in The CW television show Stargirl.

Publication history 

Thunderbolt (Yz) first appeared in Flash Comics #1, published with a cover date of January 1940, and was created by John Wentworth and Stan Aschmeier.

Fictional character biography
Yz is a fifth-dimensional genie who resided in a pen that was entrusted to Johnny Thunder on his birthday where the Badhnesians would use it to rule the world. This plan was thwarted when Badhnesia was attacked by a neighboring country. Later on, Johnny Thunder became aware of Thunderbolt's existence and the summoning word "cei-u".

In the early 1950s, Johnny is kidnapped by the Badhnesians with the intention of executing their original world conquest plan. With help from Thunderbolt, Johnny manages to summon Superman and the would-be conquerors' plans are defeated.

During Johnny Thunder's time with the Justice Society of America, his control over Thunderbolt was weakening due to a spell cast by Badhnesian priests.

When Johnny Thunder started suffering from symptoms of Alzheimer's disease, he loses track of a pen in which the Thunderbolt is being stored. The pen eventually ends up in the ownership of a young African American boy named Jakeem Williams, who takes up the name Johnny Jakeem Thunder or Jakeem Thunder.

In a later battle with Solomon Grundy, Jakeem unwittingly cures Johnny Thunder of Alzheimer's thanks to Thunderbolt. However, Johnny immediately falls prey to the Ultra-Humanite, who takes over Johnny's body to command the Thunderbolt's powers. In the "Stealing Thunder" storyline, Jakeem is one of several heroes left free from Ultra-Humanite's control. Eventually Jakeem wrests control of the Thunderbolt back from Ultra-Humanite, but Johnny Thunder loses his life. Jakeem then wishes that the Thunderbolt could save Johnny somehow, so the genie chooses to merge with Johnny, creating a new being with the memories of both. He later assumes the name Johnny Thunderbolt.

In the "DC Rebirth" reboot, it was mentioned that Johnny Thunder lost Thunderbolt after Joseph McCarthy had him reveal his secret.

In the "Watchmen" sequel "Doomsday Clock", Thunderbolt returned when Doctor Manhattan undid the experiment that erased the Justice Society of America and the Legion of Super-Heroes. He was once again merged with Johnny Thunder to become Johnny Thunderbolt.

Jakeem later encounters the Teen Titans after Djinn is forced by her brother Elias to summon Johnny Thunderbolt. Elias attacks Johnny Thunderbolt and tears an artifact known as the Stone of Souls from within its body, rendering Jakeem powerless. When the Titans nearly die while trying to save Djinn, Jakeem discovers that some of Johnny Thunderbolt's power is within his body, and is able to save the young heroes. After Elias' defeat, Djinn restores Johnny Thunderbolt and leaves with Jakeem to explore her newfound freedom.

During "The New Golden Age", Thunderbolt was with Johnny Thunder in 1940 when a Huntress from a possible future ended up sent back to their time. As Huntress meets the Justice Society of America, Thunderbolt notes that he doesn't recall meeting anyone from the future. Johnny Thunder reminds him that they met Legionnaire. As Doctor Fate tries to read Huntress' mind about the threat in her future, Thunderbolt was among those knocked down by the magical feedback.

Variants

Mzzttexxal
Mzzttexxal is a parasitic energy being from an unknown planet. She bonded with a private detective named Jonni Thunder.

Zzlrrrzzzm
Zzlrrrzzzm is a parasitic energy being from an unknown planet and is the lover of Mzzttexxal. He later became bonded to Skyman.

In other media
 The Yz incarnation of Thunderbolt makes non-speaking appearances in Justice League Unlimited as a member of an expanded Justice League.
 The Yz incarnation of Thunderbolt appears in Stargirl, voiced by an uncredited actor in the season one episode "Icicle", Jim Gaffigan in season two, and Seth Green in season three. This version requires strict rules to grant wishes, such as specific wording. Additionally, according to Pat Dugan, Thunderbolt was a dangerous weapon. In the pilot episode, Thunderbolt and Johnny Thunder were with the Justice Society of America (JSA) until they were attacked by the Injustice Society, during which Johnny was killed by Brainwave and Thunderbolt was left trapped in his pen for over 10 years after Johnny wished for him to return to it and wait for a new owner. In the episode "Summer School: Chapter Three", Dugan's son Mike gets ahold of the pen and befriends Thunderbolt. Following a confrontation with Shade however, Mike unknowingly wishes for the pen to end up in better hands, causing it to be teleported to his friend Jakeem Williams' house. Thunderbolt and Jakeem later assist Stargirl's JSA and their allies in fighting Eclipso.

References

External links
 Thunderbolt at Comic Vine

DC Comics superheroes
DC Comics deities
DC Comics characters who use magic
Fictional characters who can manipulate reality
Fictional characters who can turn invisible
Fictional characters with electric or magnetic abilities
Fictional characters with immortality
Fictional genies
Earth-Two
Comics characters introduced in 1940